Sunkara Balaparameswara Rao (12 February 1928  –  22 March 2019) was an Indian neurosurgeon.

Career

He was called the "Father of Neurosurgery" in Andhra Pradesh and has been awarded the Dr. B. C. Roy Award for organizing and developing neurosurgery in Andhra Pradesh. In 2008, he was conferred an honorary degree of Doctor of Science by the Dr. NTR University of Health Sciences. In 2015, he was awarded Lifetime Achievement award by the Telangana government. His brother Sunkara Venkata Adinarayana Rao is an orthopedic surgeon.

He died on 22nd March 2019.

Distinctions, Awards and Honours 

 Distinction in Physiology.
 Tatachary Gold Medal in Pathology.
 Dr. Ramamurthy Prize in Bacteriology.
 The Andhra Medical College Silver Jubilee Prize for the best outgoing student.
 Ebden Memorial Gold Medal for outstanding performance in M.S. (General Surgery).
 Distinguished Scientist award from A.P. Academy of Sciences in 1999.
 He received Dr. B.C.Roy National award in 1989 for organizing and developing Neurosurgery in Andhra Pradesh.
 Lifetime Achievement Award At Golden Jubilee Celebration of department of Neurosurgery of Andhra Medical College and King George Hospital at Visakhapatnam on 16 December 2005
 Lifetime Achievement Award at Regional Asian Stroke Congress and 1st National Conference of Indian Stroke Association at Chennai on 5 January 2006
 Honorary Doctorate conferred by NTR University of Health Sciences on 18 February 2008 at Vijayawada.
 Lifetime Achievement Award by International Neuro Spinal Surgeons Association of India at the annual conference at Bengaluru on 9 September 2011.
 Ugadi Puraskaram by the Andhra Pradesh Government on 23-3-2012.
 Honorary Doctorate conferred by GITAM University Visakhapatnam on 15 September 2012.
 Lifetime Achievement Award by Neurological Society of India at 64th Annual Conference at Hyderabad on 17 December 2015.
 Lifetime Achievement Award of Madras Neuro Trust.

References 

Indian neurosurgeons
1928 births
People from West Godavari district
Academic staff of Osmania University
Indian medical academics
Fellows of the National Academy of Medical Sciences
Medical doctors from Andhra Pradesh
20th-century Indian medical doctors
20th-century surgeons
Andhra University alumni
Academic staff of Andhra University
Dr. B. C. Roy Award winners
2019 deaths